Max Balard (born 20 November 2000) is an Australian professional footballer who plays as a central midfielder for Central Coast Mariners.

Career statistics

References

External links

2000 births
Living people
Australian soccer players
Association football midfielders
Central Coast Mariners FC players
National Premier Leagues players
A-League Men players